Union Hotel may refer to:

Canada
 Union Hotel, now site of the British High Commission, Ottawa

United States

 Union Hotel (Benicia, California), a California Historical Landmark, Sonoma County, California
 The Union Hotel, La Porte, California
 A former hotel in Wheeling, Illinois
 Union Hotel (Cundy's Harbor, Maine), listed on the NRHP in Maine
 Union Hotel (Meridian, Mississippi), listed on the NRHP in Mississippi
 Union Hotel (Wakefield, New Hampshire), listed on the NRHP in New Hampshire
 Union Hotel (Flemington, New Jersey), listed on the NRHP in New Jersey
 Union Hotel (Sackets Harbor, New York), listed on the NRHP in New York
 Union Hotel (Shepherdstown, Pennsylvania), listed on the NRHP in Pennsylvania

See also
 Bella Union Hotel, Los Angeles, California
 Grand Hotel Union, Ljubljana, Slovenia
 Grand Union Hotel (disambiguation)